Fajr F.3 is an Iranian full composite four-seat training/touring aircraft built by Fajr Aviation & Composites Industry. First flown in 1995, production commenced in 2001 after the aircraft was certified to JAR-23 standard. It has been speculated that it is a copy/modification of the Cirrus SR-20.

Design and development
The aircraft features a cantilever low-wing, a single-seat, a four-seat cabin accessed by gull-winged doors, tricycle landing gear and a single engine in tractor configuration.

The aircraft is made from composite material. Its  span wing mounts flaps. The standard engine used is the  Lycoming AEIO-540-L185 four-stroke powerplant.

Specifications (Fajr F.3)

See also

References

Jackson, Paul. Jane's All The World's Aircraft 2003–2004. Coulsdon, UK: Jane's Information Group, 2003. .
 Exhibitors – IRAN AIR SHOW 2008
 Full Composite Aircraft FAJR-3, Manufacturer exporting direct from IRAN

External links

1990s Iranian civil utility aircraft
Low-wing aircraft
F03
Single-engined tractor aircraft
Aircraft first flown in 1995